State Highway 139 (SH 139) is a  state highway in western Colorado, United States. SH 139's southern terminus is at Interstate 70 (I-70) in Loma, and the northern terminus is at SH 64 in Rangely.

Route description
SH 139 begins in the south at exit 15 of I-70 at Loma roughly fifteen miles west of Grand Junction. Just north of I-70 the road intersects U.S. Route 6/US 50. From there the road proceeds northward through very remote, very sparsely populated land to its northern end at SH 64 at Rangely. There are no significant settlements for the road's entire length.

History
The route was established in the 1920s, when it began at US 6 in Loma and went north to SH 64. The route was completely deleted in 1954 and reestablished by 1964, where it ended at Douglas Pass. The route was paved from Loma to Douglas Pass in 1972, when the southern terminus was extended to I-70. The route was extended back to SH 64 in 1975.

Major intersections

See also

 List of state highways in Colorado

References

External links

139
Transportation in Mesa County, Colorado
Transportation in Garfield County, Colorado
Transportation in Rio Blanco County, Colorado